Roberto Gusmeroli (born 18 October 1966) is an Italian former racing cyclist. He rode in two editions of the Tour de France.

References

External links
 

1966 births
Living people
Italian male cyclists
Cyclists from the Province of Sondrio